Sibrotuzumab is a humanized monoclonal antibody intended for the treatment of cancer. It binds to FAP

In 2003 it failed a phase II clinical trial for metastatic colorectal cancer.

References 

Monoclonal antibodies for tumors